Tjock och lycklig (Swedish for "Fat and Happy") is the third studio album by Swedish-Finnish artist Markoolio, which was released on 19 November 2001.

Track listing
Arga leken (with Kristian Luuk) - 1:02
Rocka på! Markoolio vs. The Boppers (English: "Rock On!") - 3.02
Humpa Dumpa dryck (English: "Hump, Dump, Drink") - 3:14
Lumparpolare? (with Mikael Persbrandt) - 1:34
Jag orkar inte mer (English: "I Can't Take It Anymore") - 3.48
Vi ska vinna! (with Excellence) (English: "We Will Win!") - 3:04
Båtlåten (English: "Boat Song") - 3:14
Markooliodansen (English: "The Markoolio Dance") - 3:07
Sjung Halleluja! (English: "Sing Halleluja!") - 3:58
Pojkband (with Martin Dahlin & Magnus Hedman) (English: "Boyband") - 2:31
Hoppa upp & ner! (English:"Jump Up & Down!") - 3:26
Vem vill bli inte miljonär? (English: "Who Doesn't Want To Be A Millionaire?") - 3:36
Big bang! (with Robert Aschberg) - 0:48
Varför finns jag? (English: "Why Do I Exist?") - 3.00
Aldrig mer (English: "Never Again") - 4:04
Låt mig få sova! (English: "Let Me Sleep!") - 3.48
Utelistan (with Fredrik Virtanen) - 1:41
bonus track  – Nödrimstarzan

Charts

Weekly charts

Year-end charts

References

2001 albums
Markoolio albums
Swedish-language albums